Royal Jam is a live recording by the jazz-funk band The Crusaders with B.B. King, Josie James and the Royal Philharmonic Orchestra. It was recorded at London's Royal Festival Hall.

Track listing 
All songs written by Joe Sample and Will Jennings except as noted.
"Overture (I’m So Glad I’m Standing Here Today)" – 5:51
"One Day I’ll Fly Away" – 5:49
"Fly with Wings of Love" (Joe Sample) – 9:49
"Burnin’ Up the Carnival" – 5:44
"Last Call" (Sample) – 7:59
"The Thrill Is Gone" (Roy Hawkins, Rick Darnell) – 5:26
"Better Not Look Down"  – 6:22
"Hold On"  – 4:23
"Street Life"  – 7:56
"I Just Can’t Leave Your Love Alone" – 4:15
"Never Make a Move Too Soon" (Stix Hooper, Will Jennings) – 4:12

Personnel
The Crusaders
Wilton Felder – saxophones
Joe Sample – keyboards, arrangements & orchestration
Stix Hooper – drums, percussion
Guest artists
B.B. King - vocals, guitar
Josie James - vocals (on "Burnin' Up The Carnival" and "Street Life")
Members of the Royal Philharmonic Orchestra – Conductor: Sidney Reginald Garris
Guest musicians
Barry Finnerty, David T. Walker - guitar
James Jamerson Jr. - bass
Efraim Logreira - special percussion

References

The Crusaders albums
1982 live albums